Empire Originals is the first extended play from Japanese girl group Empire. It was released on September 5, 2018, by Avex. The album consists of five tracks.

Track listing

Charts

References

2018 EPs
Empire (Japanese band) albums
Japanese-language EPs